Mezhdurechye is a rural locality (a village) in Azletskoye Rural Settlement, Kharovsky District, Vologda Oblast, Russia. The population was 14 as of 2002.

Geography 
Mezhdurechye is located 72 km northwest of Kharovsk (the district's administrative centre) by road. Kuleshikha is the nearest rural locality.

References 

Rural localities in Kharovsky District